Li Qin (born 17 April 1981 in Guangyuan, Sichuan) is a female Chinese rower, who competed for Team China at the 2008 Summer Olympics.

Major performances
2000 National Games/National Championships – 1st double sculls;
2007 World Cup Austria/Munich/Netherlands – 1st double sculls;
2007 World Championships – 1st double sculls

References

1981 births
Living people
Olympic rowers of China
People from Guangyuan
Rowers at the 2008 Summer Olympics
Asian Games medalists in rowing
Rowers from Sichuan
Rowers at the 2002 Asian Games
Rowers at the 2006 Asian Games
Chinese female rowers
Asian Games gold medalists for China
Medalists at the 2002 Asian Games
Medalists at the 2006 Asian Games
World Rowing Championships medalists for China
20th-century Chinese women
21st-century Chinese women